The Bermuda Triangle is a best-selling 1974 book by Charles Berlitz which popularized the belief of the Bermuda Triangle as an area of ocean prone to disappearing ships and airplanes. The book sold nearly 20 million copies in 30 languages.

In the book, Charles elaborates upon several theories for the purported disappearances. One of those theories states that the Bermuda Triangle was actually a by-product of the destruction of Atlantis.

The book was the subject of criticism in Larry Kusche's 1975 work The Bermuda Triangle Mystery—Solved, in which Kusche cites errors in the reports of missing ships, and has also said "If Berlitz were to report that a boat were red, the chance of it being some other color is almost a certainty." Lloyd's of London has determined the Triangle to be no more dangerous than any other piece of the ocean, and does not charge unusual rates of insurance for passage through the area. United States Coast Guard records confirm this determination. However, tales of missing ships, although promoted by Berlitz, existed prior to the book's publication. He first heard of these tales at his travel agency, wondering why his customers requested to avoid flying over this region.

The book was produced with the collaboration of J. Manson Valentine, who provided photos and illustrations. It was later the basis for a theatrical film of René Cardona Jr. released in 1978 and a Sunn Classic Pictures documentary by Richard Friedenberg released in 1979.

References

Popular culture books
1974 non-fiction books
Books about the Bermuda Triangle
Non-fiction books adapted into films